Conasprella boriqua is a species of sea snail, a marine gastropod mollusk in the family Conidae, the cone snails and their allies.

Distribution
This marine species occurs off Puerto Rico.

References

 Petuch E.J., Berschauer D.P. & Poremski A. (2016). Five new species of Jaspidiconus Petuch, 2004 (Conilithidae: Conilithinae) from the Caribbean Molluscan Province. The Festivus. 48(3): 172-178 page(s): 173, figs 1A-B

External links
 

boriqua
Gastropods described in 2016